Live at Safari Club is a live album released in 1989 by the Washington, D.C.-based go-go band Junk Yard Band. The album was recorded live at the Safari Club in Northeast, Washington, D.C., and consists of ten tracks including the songs "I Wanna Rock" and "Take Me Out to See Junkyard". The album was digitally remastered and re-released on January 3, 1997.

Track listing

"Here We Go!" – 6:03
"Work Youngen" – 4:14
"Roll Wit da Flow" – 6:44
"I Wanna Rock" – 4:06
"Knock 'Em Out the Box" – 2:36
"Prelude to Take Me Out" – 1:18
"Take Me Out to See Junkyard"  – 7:06
"Who Checked in ? " – 7:02
"Let the Beat Roll " – 4:42
"Thanx for Comin' Out!" – 4:32

References

External links
Live at Safari Club at Last.fm
Live at Safari Club at ARTISTdirect

1989 live albums
Junk Yard Band albums